Oden School District or Oden Public Schools was a school district headquartered in Oden, Arkansas.

Its schools included Oden Elementary School and Oden High School.

The Ouachita River School District was established by the merger of the Acorn School District and the Oden School District on July 1, 2004.

References

Further reading
These include maps of predecessor districts:
 Map of Arkansas School Districts pre-July 1, 2004
 (Download)

External links
 
 

Education in Montgomery County, Arkansas
Defunct school districts in Arkansas
2004 disestablishments in Arkansas
School districts disestablished in 2004